Norwich City Football Club is an association football club based in Norwich, Norfolk, and was founded in 1902. As of the 2019–20 season, they play in the Premier League. The club's first manager, John Bowman, was appointed in 1905. Since then, 40 men have held the job on a permanent basis. Since 6 January 2023, the position has been held by David Wagner.

Ken Brown holds the record for most games in charge, with a total of 367 between 1980 and 1987. Excluding caretaker managers, the shortest reigns were those of George Swindin and Jimmy Jewell, who both managed 20 games; Jewell's tenure was ended by the outbreak of the Second World War. Fifteen managers have been named in the Norwich City F.C. Hall of Fame, some of whom were also former players.

The last Norwich manager to win a major trophy was Ken Brown, who won the League Cup with Norwich in 1985. Norwich have never won the FA Cup, but have reached the FA Cup semi-finals three times – most recently in the 1989 and 1992 competitions, but also the 1958–59 FA Cup, when Archie Macaulay managed the then third-tier club to several giant-killing victories before losing a semi-final replay to Luton Town. Norwich reached the top tier of English football for the first time in 1972, under the leadership of Ron Saunders. The highest league finish Norwich have ever achieved was third in the 1992–93 season, under Mike Walker. The following season, he managed Norwich in their only European campaign to date in the UEFA Cup, when they became the only British club to ever defeat Bayern Munich at their home ground, the Olympic Stadium.

History

Early years
Norwich City was founded as an amateur football club in 1902. During the early years of the club's history, there was no manager. Arthur Turner, was the joint secretary of the club, and his wide-ranging role included that of "match secretary": according to John Eastwood, author of Canary Citizens: The Official History Of Norwich City F.C., this meant he would "look after the playing side". Following an FA Commission of inquiry, the club was informed on the last day of 1904 that they had been deemed a professional organisation and hence ineligible to compete in amateur football. The FA announced various shortcomings in the club's practices, many of which involved Turner specifically, including:  fees ... paid for the use of a gymnasium and also for the training and massage of players. The sum of £8 was also paid to a player when he left the club. Payments were made to players without a receipt being taken. The club advertised for players ... [the] secretary ... spent considerable sums of money in travelling to other towns in East Anglia ... travelling expenses were ... excessive. The club officials, including Turner, had to be removed from office and Norwich were ousted from the amateur game at the end of the season. The response was swift: at a meeting two days later, it was resolved to find a place in professional football. On 30 May 1905, they were elected to play in the Southern League, in place of Wellingborough. By then the club had secured their first professional manager, John Bowman.  Bowman served two years in the role.  He also has a place in Norwich City history for making the first recorded link between the team and its nickname "Canaries", although at this time the club nickname was "Citizens". The earliest recorded link between the club and canaries, came in a 1905 newspaper interview with Bowman, quoting him saying: "Well I knew of the City's existence ... I have ... heard of the canaries." At the time, this was a reference to Norwich's link to breeding canaries; the club's canary colours and crest would follow the adoption of the nickname.

The Norwich City player James McEwen was appointed as manager in 1907. Tom Parker was the first Norwich manager to achieve promotion, as the club won the Division Three (South) title in the 1933–34 season, before being relegated in the 1938–39 season by the slimmest of margins – a goal average of 0.05. Norman Low came close to regaining Second Division status in several seasons of the 1950s, but the return of Tom Parker led to ignominy of finishing bottom of the Football League in the 1956–57 season. The poor performance on the field was overshadowed by financial difficulties;  the club was rescued from liquidation and reformed, with Archie Macaulay appointed as manager.

Rise to the top division
Macaulay oversaw one of Norwich City's greatest achievements: its run to the semi-final of the 1958–59 FA Cup. Competing as a Third Division side, Norwich defeated two First Division opponents along the way, notably a 3–0 win against the Manchester United "Busby Babes". City lost the semi-final only after a replay against another First Division side, Luton Town. The "59 Cup Run" as it is now known locally, "remains as one of the truly great periods in Norwich City's history" according to the club. Norwich were the third-ever Third Division team to reach the FA Cup semi-final.

Macaulay then extended success to the league. In the 1959–60 season, Norwich were promoted to the Second Division after finishing behind league champions Southampton, and achieved a fourth-place finish in the 1960–61 season. From 1960, Norwich spent the next 12 seasons in the second tier, with finishes of fourth in 1961 and sixth in the 1964–65 season being among the most notable.

In 1962, Willie Reid guided  Norwich to their first trophy, defeating Rochdale 4–0 on aggregate in a two-legged final to win the League Cup.  Norwich finally achieved promotion from Division Two when they finished as champions in the 1971–72 season under Ron Saunders; Norwich City had reached the highest level of English football for the first time.

Saunders capitalised on this success, taking Norwich to their first appearance at Wembley Stadium in 1973, losing the League Cup final 1–0 to Tottenham Hotspur.  However, following a boardroom row after a 3–1 home defeat to Everton on 17 November 1973, Saunders resigned as manager on the spot. The new manager was John Bond who oversaw the club's relegation that season. A highly successful first season saw promotion back to the First Division and another visit to Wembley, again in the League Cup final, this time losing 1–0 to Aston Villa. Bond managed to keep Norwich in the top-tier of English football for another six seasons. The club finished tenth in the 1975–76 season; at the time their highest ever finish. Under Bond though, the club never managed to qualify for European competitions.  He resigned during the 1980–81 season and the club was relegated, but returned to the top tier the following season after finishing third under new manager Ken Brown.

The 1984–85 season was one of mixed fortunes for the club; a fire gutted the old Main Stand on 25 October 1984, but on the pitch, under Brown's management, they reached the final of the League Cup (known at that time as the Milk Cup) at Wembley, having defeated local rivals Ipswich Town in the semi-final. In the final, they beat Sunderland 1–0, but in the league both Norwich and Sunderland were relegated to the second tier of English football. By winning a major trophy, Brown's side qualified for the UEFA Cup, but were denied their first foray into European competition when English club sides were banned, following the Heysel Stadium disaster. City made an immediate return to the top flight by winning the Second Division championship in the 1985–86 season. Brown's success continued into the 1986–87 season, when Norwich finished fifth, but following the departure of his assistant, Mel Machin, the club made a weak start to the following season and Brown was dismissed in November 1987. Dave Stringer, who had made nearly 500 appearances for City as a player, was appointed manager. He kept Norwich in the top tier and the following season the club finished fourth, which, like the 1986–87 season, would have been enough for 1989–90 UEFA Cup qualification, but the ban on English clubs was still in place. Stringer also managed to guide City to the semi-finals of the 1988–89 FA Cup and repeated the feat in the 1991–92 tournament. However, the 1991–92 season saw Norwich flirt with relegation and finished 18th, leading to Stringer's resignation.

Premier League, Europe and club centenary
Mike Walker was Stringer's permanent successor. He arrived at Norwich City before the 1992–93 inaugural season of the English Premier League. Media and pundits tipped Norwich for a season of struggle, but the club led the league for much of the season, and eventually finished third. It was the club's highest ever finish and Norwich qualified for European football.

Walker's team played in the 1993–94 UEFA Cup, defeating Dutch club Vitesse Arnhem 3–0 in the first round. In the second round, they faced Bayern Munich. Norwich won the tie 3–2 on aggregate; their 2–1 victory in Munich earning Norwich a place in history, as the only English team to beat Bayern Munich in the Olympic Stadium.  The win in Munich was described in The Independent as "the pinnacle of Norwich City's history". Reflecting on the result, FourFourTwo wrote "The news that Norwich had gone 2–0 up in the Olympic Stadium seemed frankly surreal."  Norwich's cup run was ended by Inter Milan, who defeated them 2–0 over two legs. Walker's success at Norwich attracted attention and, in January 1994, he left the club to take charge of Everton. Walker had commented to the press earlier in his time at Norwich that "to earn a decent salary" from chairman Robert Chase, he'd have to "win the League, FA Cup and Eurovision Song Contest every year."

Walker's replacement was the first team coach John Deehan, assisted by Gary Megson, then still a player. Deehan led the club to 12th place in the 1993–94 season in the Premier League. During the 1994 close season, the club sold the 21-year-old striker Chris Sutton to Blackburn Rovers for a then British record fee of £5 million. By Christmas of the 1994–95 season, Norwich City were seventh in the Premiership and challenging for a return to the UEFA Cup, but, following a serious injury to goalkeeper Bryan Gunn, the club's performance dipped; with just one win in their final twenty Premiership fixtures, Norwich dropped to 20th place and were relegated to the second tier of English football. Deehan resigned just before relegation was confirmed; he was replaced in the summer of 1995 by former Norwich player Martin O'Neill, who had taken Wycombe Wanderers from the Conference to the Second Division with successive promotions. 

O'Neill's tenure lasted just six months; he resigned after a dispute with chairman Robert Chase over Chase's refusal to permit O'Neill to spend significant sums on strengthening the squad. According to O'Neill, the tipping point was the refusal of Chase to permit the purchase of Dean Windass. Soon after O'Neill's resignation, Chase stepped down after protests from supporters, who complained that he kept selling the club's best players, refused to reinvest in new players and consequently was to blame for relegation.

Gary Megson was appointed Norwich manager on a temporary basis for the second time in eight months: he had also briefly filled this role after Deehan's departure. Megson remained in charge until the end of the 1995–96 season before leaving the club. Mike Walker, who had struggled at Everton, was re-appointed as the club's manager. He was unable to repeat the success achieved during his first spell and was sacked in the 1997–98 season with Norwich mid-table in the First Division.

Walker's successor Bruce Rioch lasted two seasons and departed in the summer of 2000. While Rioch failed to gain promotion, his time at Norwich did leave a lasting impact in his man-management of Iwan Roberts, who had been struggling to perform. Roberts himself has ascribed his difficulties to being overweight; the turnaround was, according to Roberts, due to some clever psychology by Rioch. Roberts scored 23 goals in the 1998–99 season, and is now in the club's Hall of Fame.

Rioch's successor, Bryan Hamilton, had been appointed as director of football when Rioch took on the manager role; he lasted in the manager's job for six months before he resigned with the club 20th in the First Division, and in real danger of relegation to the third tier of English football for the first time since the 1960s.  The new appointee was Nigel Worthington, who had been Hamilton's assistant manager.  Worthington's time as Norwich manager was one of peaks and troughs, with mid-table comfort a rarity. In his first part-season, he successfully steered the team away from the threat of relegation. The following season, Norwich exceeded expectations and reached the play-off final, losing to Birmingham City on penalties.

 

After a season of consolidation, Worthington led the club to the First Division title in the 2003–04 season, a success achieved by a margin of eight points and Norwich returned to the top flight for the first time in nine years.  For much of the 2004–05 season, the club struggled in the Premiership, but the team staged a comeback in the final weeks of the season. Norwich, who had not won in months, suddenly went on a run, securing 13 points out of 18. With the bottom three sides to be automatically relegated, on the last day of the season, the club were fourth from bottom and a win would have kept them in top flight football, but a 6–0 away defeat to Fulham condemned them to relegation.

The club was expected to make a quick return to the Premiership in the 2005–06 season, but poor performances began to turn the fans against Worthington. Dean Ashton was sold for a club-record £7 m, approximately a 100% profit on the fee they had paid just one year earlier. Half of Ashton's fee was immediately reinvested in the purchase of Welsh striker Robert Earnshaw, who helped the Canaries' revival to a ninth-place finish. Worthington made just one permanent signing prior to the 2006–07 season, and when a poor run of form ensued, leaving the club in 17th place in the Championship, he was dismissed.  Former City player Peter Grant left West Ham to become the new manager.

Grant brought in fellow Scot, Jim Duffy, as his assistant, and managed to lift the side to finish 16th in the league.  During the 2007 close season, Grant brought in nine players; however ten players, including Earnshaw, departed. Darren Huckerby remained but caused controversy by criticising the club for selling their best players and berating his fellow players. When the 2007–08 season opened with only two Norwich wins by 9 October 2007, Grant left the club by "mutual consent". At the end of October, former Newcastle United boss Glenn Roeder was confirmed as the new manager. Roeder released a number of players, largely replacing them with inexperienced loan signings. Results improved significantly, lifting the club from five points adrift at the foot of the table to a comfortable mid-table position.

Following a poor first half of the 2008–09 campaign, it was announced in January 2009 that Roeder had been relieved of his first team duties. The appointment of Bryan Gunn as temporary manager did not prevent relegation to the third tier of English league football (League One), a level the club had not played at since 1960, at the end of the 2008–09 Championship season.

Norwich started their League One campaign on 8 August 2009 at home to fellow East Anglians Colchester United. They were widely expected to return swiftly to the Championship, however they suffered a 1–7 defeat. This was their worst home defeat in their 107-year history. Gunn was sacked six days later, and the club moved swiftly to appoint the man who had contributed to his downfall: Colchester manager Paul Lambert. He led Norwich to the League 1 title and promotion to the Championship in April 2010. He oversaw a turnaround in fortunes to lead Norwich to promotion back to The Championship as League One champions, during the 2009–10 season that included a 16-league-game unbeaten run that included just two draws. The 2010–11 season saw Norwich promoted to the Premier League, the first time the club had been promoted two years running.  After a successful 2011–12 season, finishing twelfth, Lambert resigned as Norwich manager in June 2012, moving to Aston Villa.

Lambert was replaced by Birmingham City's manager Chris Hughton. With Norwich one place above the relegation zone and five matches remaining in the 2013–14 season, Hughton was sacked, and replaced by youth coach and former Norwich player Neil Adams. However, they could not avoid the drop to the Championship. Under Adams, Norwich began the 2014–15 season in the Championship with good form and were second in the table in September, but performances became mixed, the club slid to seventh place and a 2–0 defeat in the 2014–15 FA Cup by Preston North End F.C. (then in League One) led to Adams' resignation. He was replaced by Hamilton Academical coach Alex Neil. A revitalised and disciplined Canaries side achieved 17 victories in the remaining 25 games, qualifying for the end of season Football League playoffs. Neil's side secured victory over local rivals Ipswich Town, before defeating Middlesbrough in the final at Wembley Stadium, to return to the Premier League.

Norwich's spell in the top flight lasted just one season, and Neil's side were expected to be contenders for the Championship title in the 2016–17 season. The side were second in the table early in the season, but a dip in form saw the Board sack Neil in March 2017, placing Alan Irvine in temporary charge.  On 25 May 2017, the German Borussia Dortmund reserve team coach Daniel Farke replaced Irvine as manager of the club on a two-year contract, becoming the first non-British manager of Norwich City.

Managers
Norwich City celebrated its centenary in 2002, in the course of which a Hall of Fame was created.

. Only professional, competitive matches are counted.

Key

Notes

References

Bibliography

External links
Norwich City official website

 
Norwich City
Managers